This is a list of works by Jim Steranko.

Comics

Interior work

DC
Catwoman: Selina's Big Score  #1, pinup (2002)
Superman #400, story "The Exile at the End of Eternity" (10pp.) (Oct. 1984)
Superman Gallery, one-shot, pinup (1993)

Marvel
Captain America #110–111, 113, plus covers (Feb.-March, May 1969)
Nick Fury: Agent of S.H.I.E.L.D.  #1–3, 5, plus covers; covers only: #4, 6–7 (Jun–Dec. 1968)
Our Love Story  #5, story "My Heart Broke in Hollywood" (7pp.) (Feb. 1970)
Strange Tales #151–153 (over Jack Kirby layouts), #154–168; odd-number covers from #151 (inker only), #153–167 (Dec. 1966 – May 1968)
Tower of Shadows #1, story "At the Stroke of Midnight" (7pp.) (Sept. 1969)
X-Men #50–51, plus covers; cover only: #49 (1968)
FOOM, cover only, #2 (Summer 1973) (also incidental art, #1–4, Feb. 1973 – Winter 1974)

Other publishers
Dark Horse Presents, vol. 2, #3 (Chapter 1 (13 pages) of Chandler: Red Tide re-drawn and re-written from original 1976 edition and also variant cover, 2011)
Double-Dare Adventures #1 (Dec. 1966; Harvey Comics) (wrote and partly penciled story "Legend of the Glowing Gladiator", possibly penciled intro page, possibly wrote story "The Secret of Magicmaster")
 Heavy Metal, vol. 5, #3–7, 10 (HM Communications; June–Oct. 1981, Jan. 1982) – Serialized Outland movie adaptation
Spyman #1–2 (Sep–Dec. 1966; Harvey Comics)
The Illustrated Harlan Ellison 3-D story "'Repent, Harlequin!' Said the Ticktockman" (10pp.) (Baronet Publishing; Dec. 1978)

Collected works

Nick Fury, Agent of S.H.I.E.L.D. (collects Strange Tales #150–168, 248 pages, Marvel Enterprises, 2000)
Nick Fury, Agent of S.H.I.E.L.D.: Who Is Scorpio? (collects Nick Fury, Agent of S.H.I.E.L.D. #1–3, 5, 96 pages, Marvel Enterprises, 2001)
Marvel Visionaries: Jim Steranko (Collects material from Captain America (1968) #110–113, Uncanny X-Men #49–51, Tower of Shadows (1969) #1, Our Love Story (1969) #5, Incredible Hulk Annual #1, Supernatural Thrillers (1973) #1–2, Fantastic Four (1961) #130–131, Creatures on the Loose (1971) #21–22, Nick Fury, Agent of SHIELD (1968) #1–2, Tex Dawson, Gun-Slinger (1973) #1, Nick Fury, Agent of SHIELD (1983) #1, and Western Gunfighters (1970) #14, Marvel Enterprises, 128 pages, 2002)
Marvel Masterworks: Nick Fury, Agent of S.H.I.E.L.D. Vol. 1 (Collects STRANGE TALES #135–153, TALES OF SUSPENSE #78 and FANTASTIC FOUR #21, Marvel Enterprises, 2009)
Marvel Masterworks: Nick Fury, Agent of S.H.I.E.L.D. Vol. 2 (Collects STRANGE TALES #154–168 and NICK FURY, AGENT OF SHIELD #1–3., Marvel Enterprises, 2009)
Marvel Masterworks: Nick Fury, Agent of S.H.I.E.L.D. Vol. 3 (collects STRANGE TALES #135–153, TALES OF SUSPENSE #78 and FANTASTIC FOUR #21, Marvel Enterprises, 2009)
S.H.I.E.L.D. By Steranko: The Complete Collection (collects Strange Tales (1951) #151–168, Nick Fury, Agent of S.H.I.E.L.D. (1968) #1–3 & 5, 352 pages, Marvel Enterprises, 2013; ASIN B00PSN1N7S)
Steranko is Revolutionary! collects Nick Fury stories from Strange Tales #151–168, 336 pages, September 2020,

Comics covers work
 Action Comics #1000, (DC, variant, 2018)
 Batman Black and White vol. 2 #2 (DC, 2013)
 Before Watchmen: Rorschach #1, (DC, variant, 2012)
 Black Panther, vol. 6, #5D (Oct. 2016)
 Civil War II #7 (variant, Marvel, Nov 2016)
 Creatures on the Loose #21–22 (Jan.-March 1973)
 Daredevil #44 (inks only, Marvel, September 1968)
 Detective Comics #1000, (DC, variant, 2019)
 Doc Savage #2–3 (December 1972 – February 1973)
 Eerie #25 (Warren Publishing, Jan. 1970)
 Epic Illustrated #19 (Marvel, August 1983)
 Fantastic Four #130–132 (Marvel, January–March 1973)
 The Fly #1–2 (Archie Comics, May–July 1983)
 The Green Hornet #1 (Now Comics, Nov. 1989)
 The Incredible Hulk King-Size Special #1 (Oct. 1968) (Hulk head redrawn by Marie Severin)
 Hercules – The Thracian Wars  #1, 2 versions – one fully painted and one pencils only (Radical Comics; May 2008)
 Hercules – The Thracian Wars #2, pencils only variant (Radical Comics; 2008)
 Hercules – The Knives of Kush #1, fully painted (Radical Comics; 2009)
 Kabuki #1 (Image Comics, 1997)
 Nick Fury Agent of S.H.I.E.L.D., Special Edition #1 (Marvel, 1983)
 Nick Fury vs. S.H.I.E.L.D. #1 (Marvel, June 1988)
 Nick Fury and His Agents of S.H.I.E.L.D. #1–2 (Marvel, February and April 1973)
 Marvel Comics Super Special #22 (Blade Runner, Marvel, September 1982)
 Phazer #1, (RGZ, Cover A, 2012)
 Ray Bradbury Comics: Martian Chronicles #1 (Topps Comics/Byron Preiss Visual Publications, June 1994)
 Shanna the She-Devil #1–2 (Marvel, December 1972 – February 1973)
 Supernatural Thrillers #1–2 (December 1972 – February 1973)
 Turf #1, (Image Comics, 2010)
 The Victorian #1 (Penny-Farthing Press; March 1999)
 Tex Dawson, Gunslinger #1 (Jan. 1973)
 Western Gunfighters #14 (March 1973)
 X-Men #49, (Marvel, October–December 1968)

Books
Steranko on Cards (Ireland Magic Company, 1960)
Kort is now in Session (1962 – Designed and Illustrated only)
The Steranko History of Comics 1 (Supergraphics, 1970, ; also wraparound cover)
The Steranko History of Comics 2 (Supergraphics, 1972; also wraparound cover)
Chandler: Red Tide Fiction Illustrated (Byron Preiss Visual Publications/Pyramid Books, 1976)
Unseen Shadows: 50 Cover Concept Illustrations (Supergraphics, 1978)
Domino Lady: The Complete Collection (Vanguard Productions 2004)

Book covers

Prisoners of the Sky by C. C. MacApp (pseudonym of Carroll M. Capps) (1969; science fiction)
The Mighty Barbarians: Great Sword and Sorcery Heroes, Hans Stefan Santesson, ed. (1969)
Ice World (1969; science fiction)
Return to the Stars (1969; science fiction)
Why Isn't a Nice Girl Like You Married? or How to Get Most Out of Life While You're Single by Rebecca Greer (1970; self-help)
Master Of The Dark Gate by John Jakes (1970) 
Kelwin by Neal Barrett, Jr.(1970)
Fletcher by Jack Bickham (1970) (Western)
Wildcat O'Shea: A Stranger Named O'Shea (1970) by Jeff Clinton (Western)
Infinity One by Robert Hoskins (1970; science fiction)
Lord of Blood by Dave Van Arnam (1970; sword-and-sorcery)
The Mighty Swordsmen, Hans Stefan Santesson, ed. (1970)
G-8 and His Battle Aces #1: The Bat Staffel by Robert J. Hogan (1970; World War I)
G-8 and His Battle Aces: Ace of the White Death by Robert J. Hogan (1970)
G-8 and His Battle Aces: Purple Aces by Robert J. Hogan (1970)
Warlocks and Warrior, L. Spague de Camp, ed. (1971; sword-and-sorcery)
Wildcat O'Shea: Bounty on Wildcat (1971) by Jeff Clinton (Western)
Wildcat O'Shea: Wildcat's Claim To Fame (1971) by Jeff Clinton
Wildcat O'Shea: Wildcat's Revenge (1971) by Jeff Clinton
The Shores Of Tomorrow by David Mason (1971; science fiction)
Infinity Two by Robert Hoskins (1971; science fiction)
The Masters of the Pit a.k.a. Barbarians of Mars by Michael Moorcock (1971; science fiction)
Infinity Three by Robert Hoskins (1972; science fiction)
The Further Adventures of Erik John Stark: The Ginger Star by Leigh Brackett (1974; sword-and-sorcery) 
The Further Adventures of Erik John Stark 2: The Hounds Of Skaith by Leigh Brackett (1974) 
The Further Adventures of Erik John Stark 3: The Reavers of Skaith by Leigh Brackett (1976) 
Police Your Planet by Lester Del Rey with Erik van Lhin (1975; science fiction) 
Weird Heroes Volume 1 (1975; pulp-inspired anthology) 
Weird Heroes Volume 2 (1975; pulp-inspired anthology)
The Unknown (1978; reprints of pulp magazine stories – anthology)
Norgil the Magician by Maxwell Grant (pseudonym of Walter Gibson) (1977 reprints of pulp magazine stories) 
Norgil: More Tales of Prestigitection by Maxwell Grant (1979 reprints of pulp magazine stories) 
Tomorrow I Die by Mickey Spillane (1984) 
Blade of the Guillotine (1986)
Death Mask of Pancho Villa (1987)
Wild Cards XVI: Deuces Down, ed. by George R.R. Martin and Melinda Snodgrass (2002)
Swords and Deviltry 1 : Fafrd and the Gray Mouser (2003)
Swords against Death 2 : Fafrd and the Gray Mouser (2003)
Swords in the Mist/Swords against Wizardry 3/4 : Fafrd and the Gray Mouser (2004)
Meth o d, by Clifford Meth (2006)
Conspiracy of the Planet of the Apes (2011)

Pyramid Books
The Shadow (reprints of pulp-magazine stories)
By Maxwell Grant (pseudonym of Walter Gibson)
The Shadow #1: The Living Shadow (1974) 
The Shadow #2: The Black Master (1974) 
The Shadow #4: Hands in the Dark (1974)
The Shadow #5: Double Z (1975)
The Shadow #6: The Crime Cult (1975) 
The Shadow #9: The Romanoff Jewels (1975) 
The Shadow #10: The Silent Seven (1975) 
The Shadow #11: Kings of Crime (1976)
The Shadow #12: Shadowed Millions (1976) 
The Shadow #13: Green Eyes (1977) 
The Shadow #14: The Creeping Death (1977) 
The Shadow #16: The Shadow's Shadow (1977) 
The Shadow #17: Fingers Of Death (1977) 
The Shadow #18: Murder Trail (1977) 
The Shadow #19: Zemba (1977) 
The Shadow #20: Charg, Monster 
The Shadow #21: The Wealth Seeker (1978) 
The Shadow #22: The Silent Death (1978)
The Shadow #23: The Death Giver (1978)
The Shadow #1: The Living Shadow (1978) (Different from 1974 edition)
The Shadow #9: The Romanoff Jewels (1978) (Different from 1975 edition)
The Shadow #11: Kings of Crime (1978) (Different from 1976 edition)
The Shadow #12: Shadowed Millions (1978) (Different from 1976 edition)

Other
The Revenge of the Hound: The New Sherlock Holmes Novel by Michael Hardwick (1987; mystery) 
The Return of Valkyrie: An Airboy Graphic Album edited by Timothy Truman (1989) 
Palladium Books Presents: Mystic China by Erick Wujcik (1995) 
The Little Sister by Raymond Chandler (1997)
Heroes Unlimited: Second Edition (1998)
Captain America: Liberty's Torch (1998)
The Bride Wore Black (2001)
Phantom Lady (2001)
Rear Window (2001)
Night and the City (2001)
Visual Storytelling: The Art and Technique by Tony C. Caputo; introduction by Harlan Ellison (2003) 
Compliments of the Domino Lady by Lars Anderson (2004 reprints of pulp-magazine stories) 
The Edge (2004)
Domino Lady: The Complete Collection by Lars Anderson (2004) 
Domino Lady: The Complete Collection Deluxe by Lars Anderson (2004; signed limited edition) 
Drifter's Detour, by Bill Pearson (2006)
The Spider: Robot Titans of Gotham, by Norvell W. Page (2007)
The Spider: City of Doom, by Norvell W. Page (2008)
Comixscene/Mediascene/Prevue, #1–92 (1972–1994) Magazine published by Supergraphics -Steranko was publisher, designer, editor and also contributed as writer and artist.
Star Wars Art: Comics, double page illustration (2011)

Biographical books
Books about Steranko includes:
Steranko: Graphic Narrative by Philip Fry & Ted Poulos; introduction and illustrations by Jim Steranko (Winnipeg Art Gallery exhibit publication, 1978)
Steranko: Graphic Prince of Darkness by Jim Steranko, J. David Spurlock, Peter DePree (Vanguard Productions, 1997).
Steranko Arte Noir by Jim Steranko, J. David Spurlock, Angel de la Calle (Vanguard Productions/Semana Negra, 2002)
Visual Theory: The Steranko Archives, Volume 1 (2003)
Visual Storytelling: The Art and Technique (2003)
Tout N’est Qu’Illusion…Jim Steranko by Guillaume Laborie (155 pages, printed in French, 2009)

Notes

References

 

Bibliographies of American writers
Bibliographies by writer
Lists of comics by creator